The Cry (also called La Llorona, which translates to "The Crying Woman") is a 2007 American independent horror film directed by Bernadine Santistevan and co-written with Monique Salazar.

Plot

With help from his partner Sergio Perez (Carlos Leon), New York detective Alex Scott (Christian Camargo) is investigating the mysterious disappearance of several missing children. They interview Gloria the Curandera (Míriam Colón) who advises that an evil force is pursuing the reincarnation of her son and is drowning missing children to bring pain to their parents.

Cast
 Adriana Domínguez as Maria 
 Christian Camargo as Alex Scott 
 Carlos Leon as Sergio Perez 
 Míriam Colón as Gloria the Curandera 
 Kate Blumberg as Judy Hardwich 
 Jayden Vargas as Tonio 
 Quinn McCann as Ryan Weit 
 Jane Petrov as Lynn Weit 
 Ron Dailey as Man with Stroller 
 Lisa G. as Reporter Diane Penn 
 Izzy Ruiz as Detective Vega 
 Kristin Taylor as Detective Taylor 
 Caroline Cole as Assistant D.A. Tanin

Background
The story is based upon the Mexican urban legend of La Llorona. The legend began in Aztec mythos where the goddess Cihuacoatl was said to have taken the form of a beautiful lady draped in white garments to predict the death of her children. This early myth evolved into the modern Mexico version of La Llorona, a woman who, betrayed by her husband, drowned her children out of revenge. As punishment for this horrific act, La Llorona’s spirit is condemned to roam the earth for eternity, crying for her children.

Theatrical and festival release
The Cry made its world debut Friday, May 12, 2007 at the Lensic Theater in Santa Fe, New Mexico, with the premiere sponsored by The Healy Foundation.  In its opening weekend, The Cry made $6,968 at 4 cinemas, and overall made only $21,427 during its theatrical release.  It then screened in several European film festivals, including the Cannes Film Festival on May 20, 2007, and the Ravenna Nightmare Film Festival on October 30, 2007, after which it was picked up for DVD distribution by Monterey Media.

Reception
When the film was released on DVD in May 2008 it received mixed critical attention from the media.  Sara Schieron of Box Office Movie Reviews panned the film by stating "...Less-than-middling attempt to exploit the potent Mexican myth of La Llorona (the crying woman) fails largely due to a crutch-like reliance on already weak genre conventions and haphazard script".  Kryten Syxx of Dread Central also felt the film was meritless, and after watching it concluded, "Bernadine Santistevan has some talent hidden somewhere, but it sure isn’t used here".  Being more forgiving, Justin Felix of DVD Talk wrote "Despite The Cry's letdown of an ending, it was still an interesting character-driven horror film".  The Cry does have its supporters.  Anthony Thurber of Film Arcade wrote, the "screenplay written by Santistevan and writer Monique Salazar was very frightening. They make this film haunting and very disturbing". Elliot Kotek of Moving Pictures Magazine stated, "Half the brilliance in the film's direction is its speed, so any awkward moments are over quickly and, by not over-penning the piece with long conversations, the filmmakers are rewarded with a rich rising tension often lacking in more fiscally-blessed flicks".  And Best Horror Movies wrote "The Cry is suspenseful and shocking, especially in light of the victims of this terrible curse".

References

External links
 
 
 The Cry at AbandoMoviez
 The Cry at american-vulture.com
 The Cry at dvdverdict.com

2007 films
2007 horror films
American independent films
Films about dreams
Films about nightmares
American supernatural horror films
Films based on urban legends
2007 independent films
La Llorona
2000s English-language films
2000s American films